Izabela Dragneva-Rifatova (born October 1, 1971 in Varna) is a retired weightlifter from Bulgaria, who is best known for being the first female weightlifter to be stripped of her medal and results and disqualified from an Olympic games for cheating. She twice competed for her native country at the Summer Olympics: 2000 (the first year women's weightlifting was contested as an Olympic sport) and 2004. She won the silver medal in the women's – 53 kg division at the 1998 World Weightlifting Championships in Lahti.

Dragneva competed in the 48 kg category at the 2000 Summer Olympics where she originally won the gold medal. She was stripped of her gold medal three days later after she tested positive for the banned diuretic furosemide.

Also, because multiple Bulgarian weightlifters tested positive in previous Olympic competitions, the entire Bulgarian weightlifting team was disqualified and sent home from the Games. The IWF cited their 'Three Strikes' rule for the disassociation.

Dragneva's disqualification meant that American Tara Nott was awarded the gold medal in the 48 kg class.

See also
List of sportspeople sanctioned for doping offences
List of stripped Olympic medals

References

1971 births
Living people
Bulgarian female weightlifters
Weightlifters at the 2000 Summer Olympics
Weightlifters at the 2004 Summer Olympics
Olympic weightlifters of Bulgaria
Bulgarian sportspeople in doping cases
Doping cases in weightlifting
Sportspeople from Varna, Bulgaria
Competitors stripped of Summer Olympics medals
European Weightlifting Championships medalists
World Weightlifting Championships medalists
21st-century Bulgarian women